Sheikh Riza Talabani was a celebrated Kurdish poet from Kirkuk, Iraq. Talabani wrote his poetry in Kurdish, Persian, and Arabic.  Most of his poetry consists of Satire, Ribaldry, Flyting and creative insults.

The poet in one of his famous poems recalled his childhood in the Kurdish Emirate of Baban before it was ruled by the Persians or the Ottomans.

As a young man of age twenty-five or so, the poet went to the Ottoman capital, Constantinople (Istanbul), and in the course of his journey, he visited the grave of the Kurdish Sufi, Sheikh Nurredin Brifkani. At the graveside he recited a long poem in Persian, telling of how he had journeyed from the Emirate of Sharazur to visit The Country of the Rom. In 1879, when the Ottoman Empire annexed the Wilayah of Sharazur to the Wilayah of Mosul, Riza expressed his sadness and disappointment in a poem, in Turkish, in which he told the people that Mosul had now become the capital of their Wilayah and Nafi’i Effendi was the Wali.

Riza Talabani is one of the foremost Kurdish poets. To date, seven editions of his poetry have been published: in Baghdad in 1935 and 1946, in Iran, in Sweden in 1996, in As Sulaymaniyah in 1999 and, most recently, in Arbil in 2000.

See also
Kurdish literature
List of Kurds
Kurdish language

References

1835 births
1910 deaths
Kurdish people from the Ottoman Empire
People from Kirkuk
Iraqi Kurdish poets
Persian-language poets
Iraqi Turkish poets
19th-century poets of Ottoman Iraq
20th-century Iraqi poets
Iraqi multilingual poets